Alucita decaryella is a species of moth of the family Alucitidae. It is known from Madagascar.

References

Alucitidae
Moths of Madagascar
Moths of Africa
Moths described in 1956
Taxa named by Pierre Viette